Periodontal surgery is a form of dental surgery that prevents or corrects anatomical, traumatic, developmental, or plaque-induced defects in the bone, gingiva, or alveolar mucosa. The objectives of this surgery include accessibility of instruments to root surface, elimination of inflammation, creation of an oral environment for plaque control, periodontal diseases control, oral hygiene maintenance, maintain proper embrasure space, address gingiva-alveolar mucosa problems, and esthetic improvement.
The surgical procedures include crown lengthening, frenectomy, and mucogingival flap surgery.

Indications

Contraindications
Some contraindications include:

 Patient with poor standard of plaque control
 Questionable long-term prognosis of patient dentition
 Pregnancy
 Smoking
 Severe cardiovascular disease
 Malignancy
 Bleeding disorders
 Uncontrolled diabetes
 Kidney disease
 Liver disease

Considerations 

 The procedural selection in a periodontal surgery should rely on simplicity, predictability, efficiency, Mucogingival considerations, osseous topography, anatomic and physical limitations, age  and  systemic  factors.
 The incisions should be clear, smooth, and well-defined to minimize the healing time. Such incisions prevent  occurrence of uneven ragged flap edges.
 To maintain the functional zone of the attached keratinized gingiva, flaps should be designed for maximum use and retention of keratinized gingival tissue , as it prevents the need of secondary procedures.
 In the design of flaps, it needs to be ensured that there is adequate access and visibility. The design should also prevent bone exposure as it can lead to formation of dehiscence or fenestration.
 For prevention of excessive bleeding, hematoma formation, displacement, bone exposure, or infection, adequate  flap  stabilization should be ensured.
 The surgical procedure should  be  carried out such a manner that the postoperative healing takes place by primary intention and not by secondary intention.

Surgical procedures

Crown lengthening   
Crown lengthening is a technique for increasing crown height of teeth by flap surgery with or without bone surgery. There are two main types:

 Aesthetic crown lengthening which is performed when a “gummy” smile is an issue for the patient
 Functional crown lengthening is used to make an unrestorable tooth restorable. For example, a tooth with caries that extends below the gums may undergo crown lengthening so that the caries is no longer below the gums and a crown may be placed.

Contraindications 
Untreated or unstable gum disease (periodontal disease) and gingival phenotype

Considerations 

 Strategic value of tooth
 Crown/root ratio that will remain following surgery
 Aesthetics will be affected such as longer clinical crowns and loss of interdental papillae leading to “black triangles”
 It can result in exposure of furcations
 Mobility of teeth
 Post-op sensitivity due to root dentine exposure
 Patient may need long-term treatment until gingival margin stabilised (3–6 months).
 Patient must also be made aware prior to surgery that relapse is possible

Method 
There are three main methods for surgical crown lengthening:

 Gingivectomy
 Apically repositioned flap (APF) surgery
 Apically repositioned flap (APF) with osseous reduction (osteoplasty/ostectomy)

Frenectomy 
Frenectomy is indicated by thick, prominent muscle attachments known as fraena or a frenum with close attachment to the gum margin. Thick frenum attachment or close attachment to gum margin can contribute to increased plaque accumulation, persistent inflammation, muscular pull on gum and affect gum contour.

Usual sites for frenectomy are buccal regions of upper and lower incisors, upper canines and premolars. Frenectomy is rarely required for lingual sites.

Procedure 
Frenectomy procedure consists of:

 Cutting the attachment of the frenum to the gums
 Administering local anaesthetic
 Stretching the lip and gripping the frenum with forceps
 Cutting through base of frenum on both sides of forceps
 Incision on alveolar side near to bone leaving the periosteum intact.
 Removal of the frenal tissue and suturing the edges of the wound closely with resorbable sutures
 Placing Swabs over the wound
 The patient is instructed to rinse twice daily with chlorohexidine mouthwash.

Mucogingival flap surgery 
Mucogingival surgery is a procedure where the gums are separated from teeth and temporarily folded back to allow the dentist to directly view and reach root surface of the tooth and bone. It is used for crown lengthening surgery. It also, if required, can be used for guided tissue regeneration or open flap debridement (OFD) to treat gum disease (periodontitis/periodontal disease). The presence of bacteria, in the form of dental plaque/tartar/calculus on the root of a tooth, can cause inflammation of the gums resulting in gum disease. This can lead to bone loss around the affected teeth and if left untreated, lead to tooth loss. When a tooth has very deep periodontal pockets it may not be possible to fully remove the dental plaque/tartar/calculus from the tooth’s root surface with scaling alone. In open flap debridement (OFD) the gum is peeled back to make it possible for the dentist to see and ensure full removal of tartar/calculus from these difficult to access areas. Teeth with furcation defects as a result of gum recession may require open flap debridement (OFD) as these areas can be very difficult to clean.

Mucogingival flaps thickness 
Full thickness flap involves incision down to bone. Using blunt dissection, the flap is raised from bone. Full thickness flap is a simple procedure which provides access to root surface and bone. The procedure leaves minimal post-operative discomfort. It provides limited mobility of flap and is unsuitable for grafting.

Split thickness flap involves sharp cutting of tissues and leaving the underlying periosteum intact. The procedure prevents exposure dehiscence and allows good blood supply for grafting. It does not provide access to underlying bone or root surface and results in greater post-operative discomfort.

References

Dental surgical procedures
Surgery